Köln-Lövenich is a railway station situated at Lövenich, Cologne in western Germany on the Cologne–Aachen railway. It is classified by Deutsche Bahn as a category 5 station.

Lövenich station was opened on 2 July 1840 with the second phase of construction of the Cologne–Aachen railway at line-km 9.0 and was the western terminus of the line for about a year. In 2002, an S-Bahn stop was built west of the station at 9.7 km. At the same time, the former Lövenich station was dismantled and is now used only for passing loops. The S-Bahn stop has an island platform between the S-Bahn tracks.

The station is served by Rhine-Ruhr S-Bahn line S13 between Sindorf or Düren and Troisdorf and line S19 between Düren and Hennef (Sieg), Blankenberg (Sieg), Herchen or Au (Sieg). Together these lines provide a service every 20 minutes on weekdays and every 30 minutes on the weekend. During the peak, line S12 also provides services every 20 minutes between Horrem and Hennef (Sieg).

Notes

S12 (Rhine-Ruhr S-Bahn)
Railway stations in Cologne
Rhine-Ruhr S-Bahn stations
S13 (Rhine-Ruhr S-Bahn)
Railway stations in Germany opened in 2002